Robert John Brillante (born February 27, 1959) is a cable television manager and executive. A former partner in the now defunct Florida’s News Channel, he was the chief executive officer of the defunct Black News Channel.

Florida’s News Channel
Florida's News Channel used virtual reality news environments with customized local scenery in each of Florida’s seven major television markets. FNC was forced off the air when Comcast canceled all broadcasts "due to lack of viewer interest."

Black News Channel
In 2003, Brillante announced plans to start the Black Television News Channel. Despite a pilot newscast begun in 2003, the network never went on the air.

Personal life
Brillante is married to Dana Brillante. The couple currently resides in North Florida, maintaining a home in Tallahassee and on St. George Island.

References

External links
 Brillante Enterprises, Inc. official Web site
 Black News Channel official Web site

1959 births
Living people